Last Meeting is a 1951 Italian melodrama film directed by Gianni Franciolini and starring Alida Valli, Amedeo Nazzari and Jean-Pierre Aumont. It is loosely based on the novel  La biondina by Marco Praga.

The film's sets were designed by the art director Flavio Mogherini.

Cast 

Alida Valli as  Lina Castelli
Amedeo Nazzari as Piero Castelli 
Jean-Pierre Aumont as Michele Bonesi 
Leda Gloria as Bianca 
Vittorio Sanipoli as Augusto 
Giovanna Galletti as Flora 
Harry Weedon as Mr. Hermans
Laura Carli as Miss Maria
Michele Riccardini as Lodi Stationmaster
Michele Malaspina as Vincenzi 
Nino Farina as himself
Juan Manuel Fangio as himself
Consalvo Sanesi as himself
Felice Bonetto as himself
Hans von Stuck as himself
Luigi Fagioli as himself

References

External links

1951 films
1951 drama films
Italian drama films
Films directed by Gianni Franciolini
Italian auto racing films
Formula One mass media
Lux Film films
Films scored by Enzo Masetti
Melodrama films
Italian black-and-white films
1950s Italian films